Pete Bicknell (born 1955) is a Canadian modified racer from St. Catharines, Ontario who was inducted into the Canadian Motorsport Hall of Fame in 2002. He was inducted into the Northeast Dirt Modified Hall of Fame in 2012 and as of 2022 is still driving Modifieds. As of 2011 he had won over 400 modified features in three countries and 42 track championships at four different tracks.

References

1955 births
Living people
Racing drivers from Ontario
Sportspeople from St. Catharines